Phyllocnistis endoxa is a moth of the family Gracillariidae, known from Maharashtra and Karnataka, India. The hostplant for the species is Aporosa lindleyana.

References

Phyllocnistis
Endemic fauna of India
Moths of Asia